Ramazanabad (also Romanized as Ramaẕānābād and Ramezānābād; also known as Ramaẕānābād-e Qorbān ‘Alī, Rashnū, and Shanū) is a village in Mirbag-e Shomali Rural District, in the Central District of Delfan County, Lorestan Province, Iran. At the 2006 census, its population was 165, in 33 families.

References 

Towns and villages in Delfan County